Stacey Toran (October 11, 1961 – August 5, 1989) was an American football defensive back. He played for the Los Angeles Raiders for five seasons. A native of Indianapolis and a graduate of Broad Ripple High School, Toran was a member of the school's 1980 Indiana High School Boys Basketball Tournament championship team. His 57-foot (17 m) shot with one second remaining in the semifinal game against Marion High School put them into the final game. After high school, he played football for the University of Notre Dame before being drafted by the Raiders in the 1984 NFL Draft.  He was killed in an automobile accident, speeding around a turn on Glencoe Avenue, near Alla Park in Marina Del Rey. He was buried in Crown Hill Cemetery in Indiana.

References

External links
Raiders’ Toran is Killed

1961 births
1989 deaths
American football defensive backs
Road incident deaths in California
Los Angeles Raiders players
Notre Dame Fighting Irish football players
Burials at Crown Hill Cemetery